This is a list of Kosovo national football team results from 1942 to 1975.

History

First match
On 29 November 1942, Kosovo for first time in its history played a friendly match as part of the celebrations for 30th Anniversary of the Independence of Albania against Tirana, and the match ended with a 2–0 away defeat and the starting line-up of that match was Mustafa Daci, Ballanca, Ahmet Zaimi, Mazllum Xërxa, Veseli, Hajdar Hamza, Nebil Dylatahu, Ramadan Vraniqi, Dobrica Barbaroga, Bajrami and Henci.

1967–1975
On 8 November 1967, Kosovo for first time as autonomous province of SFR Yugoslavia played a friendly match against Yugoslavia and the match ended with a 3–3 home draw and the starting line-up of that match was a mix between Albanian and Serbian players as Milosavlević, Stevanović, Mušikić, Abrashi, S. Džukić, V. Džukić, Brovina, Hatibi, Radović, Prekazi and Pindović, for Yugoslavia this match it was a pre-preparation before the UEFA Euro 1968 qualifying match against Albania.

Brotherhood and Unity Tournament
Eight years after the match against Yugoslavia, Kosovo in 1975 participated for the first and last time in Brotherhood and Unity Tournament, which was held in Pristina and Prizren, where won in all four matches of this tournament against Montenegro (2–0), Bosnia and Herzegovina (2–1), Slovenia (2–0) and Macedonia (1–0) and also took first place.

Fixtures and results

As Albanian Prefecture

As Autonomous Province of SFR Yugoslavia

Kosovo against their opponents

Notes and references

Notes

References

External links
Kosovo at RSSSF

Senior